Levashov, feminine: Levashova is a Russian family name. Notable people with the name include:

Nikolai Levashov
Mikhail Levashov (disambiguation), several persons
Peter Levashov
Klavdiya Fomicheva-Levashova

See also

Russian-language surnames

ru:Левашов